Henry Fisher House is a historic home located in Oley Township, Berks County, Pennsylvania.   It was built between 1798 and 1801, and is a -story, five bay by two bay, limestone dwelling with a steeply pitched gable roof. It has a two-story, rear kitchen addition with a flat roof. The main house has a Georgian center hall plan. The Fisher family has lived in the house since it was completed.

It was listed on the National Register of Historic Places in 1973.

References

External links
 

Houses on the National Register of Historic Places in Pennsylvania
Georgian architecture in Pennsylvania
Houses completed in 1801
Houses in Berks County, Pennsylvania
Historic American Buildings Survey in Pennsylvania
National Register of Historic Places in Berks County, Pennsylvania